Créole was a 40-gun frigate of the French Navy, a one-off design by Jacques-Augustin Lamothe. The French Navy loaned her to a privateer in 1797. Later, she served in the Brest squadron, took part in Ganteaume's expeditions of 1801 to Egypt, and was involved in the French acquisition of Santo Domingo (also known as the Era de Francia) and briefly detained Toussaint Louverture before he was brought to France. The 74-gun ships  and  captured her Santo Domingo on 30 June 1803. The Royal Navy took her into service but she foundered soon afterwards during an attempt to sail to Britain; her crew were rescued.

Career

Early career 
After her launch, Créole was fitted for four months before being lent 19 October 1797 to a privateer from Nantes. She was commissioned in the Navy on 29 April 1798 and started patrolling off Brest in February 1799.

On 12 April, capitaine de vaisseau Pierre-Paulin Gourrège took command. On 26 April 1799, Créole departed Brest with the oceanic fleet and took part in Bruix' expedition of 1799 into the Mediterranean. She was detached to Oneglia, along with Romaine and Vautour, to support the French invasion of Italy.

The British hired armed cutter Sandwich was under the command of Lieutenant George Lempriere and cruising off the coast of Barcelona on 14 June 1799 when she sighted a large fleet. Lempriere believed the vessels to be a British fleet and sailed towards them. When the strange vessels did not reply to the recognition signals, Lempriere realized that they were enemy vessels and attempted to sail away. The French fleet detached a lugger, possibly Affronteur, to pursue Sandwich. A frigate joined the lugger in pursuit and towards evening the lugger opened fire with her bow chasers. The frigate then too opened fire, with Sandwich returning fire as best she could. By 1a.m. the frigate was within musket shot of Sandwich and any further resistance would have been futile. Lempriere then struck to Créole.

In 1800, Créole was part of a division under contre-amiral Lacrosse, tasked to cruise off Morbihan and cut off the royalists from their British support. In order to avoid the British blockade, the squadron anchored to Camaret, but attracted the attention of the British and sailed back to harbour to avoid engagement. The division was retasked to ferry 4600 troops to Santo Domingo, but again ran into the British blockade, turned back and adjourned its mission. During the cruise, Créole sustained some damage in a collision with Fidèle.

Ganteaume's expeditions of 1801 

On 27 January 1801, Créole departed Brest with a division under contre-amiral Ganteaume, tasked to ferry ammunitions and reinforcements to the Armée d'Égypte, taking part in Ganteaume's expeditions of 1801. After several false starts due to unfavourable weather or to the British blockade, Ganteaume eventually set sail on 23 February on a heavy sea which soon dispersed his squadron. The next day, Créole rejoined Indivisible, and the two ships sailed together until they finally made contact with their division.

Ganteaume reached Toulon on 18 February; Gourrège left Créole to take command of the flagship Indivisible on 9 March. The squadron set sail on 25 April. His crew much weakened by an epidemic, Ganteaume managed to establish a blockade of Elba on 1 May and bombard Portoferraio on 6 May, supporting the Siege of Porto Ferrajo, but he had to detach Formidable, Indomptable, Dessaix and Créole to ferry the sick to Livorno and return to Toulon.

Créole took an incidental part in the action of 24 June 1801, where the lone British 74-gun HMS Swiftsure met the French squadron and was captured after a running battle.

Santo Domingo 
On 9 January 1802, Créole departed Toulon with a division under contre-amiral Ganteaume, ferrying troops to Santo Domingo to consolidate the French occupation of Santo Domingo. After Toussaint Louverture surrendered, he was embarked on Créole before being transferred on Héros and ferried to France, where he died in prison. Boarding the frigate, Louverture stated:

In 1803, Créole ferried troops to Port-au-Prince under Commander Jean-Marie-Pierre Lebastard, travelling to Jean-Rabel from Cap-Français with 530 soldiers under General Morgan. Her crew suffered from the yellow fever that was endemic to the campaign, so that only 150 men were fit and the frigate was 177 short of her usual complement. In the morning of 30 June, Créole met five British ships of the line, who closed in to investigate and gave chase. Créole was unable to escape the ships of the line as Vanguard and Cumberland came up and flanked her. Vanguard opened fire, and after a single token gunshot, Créole struck to her overwhelmingly better-armed opponents.

Fate
A prize crew conveyed Créole to Port Royal in Jamaica for repair. There the Royal Navy commissioned her as HMS Creole under Captain Austin Bissell.

In late 1803 Créole sailed for Britain with a prize crew and numerous French prisoners. Créole was in a poor state, and on 26 December she sprang a leak. The crew and prisoners manned her pumps but were unable to prevent the accumulation of water such that by 30 December the water was rising by two feet per hour. Two leaks became evident, one forward and one aft of the hold. The crew threw her guns, shot, iron ballast and some stores overboard, and slung a sail under the hull. Still, by 2 January the pumps were again unable to prevent the accumulation of water. The crew and the prisoners were exhausted and so Bissell decided to abandon ship. Cumberland came up to take everyone off Créole.

Notes, citations, and references

Notes

Citations

References

 
 Fonds Marine. Campagnes (opérations ; divisions et stations navales ; missions diverses). Inventaire de la sous-série Marine BB4. Tome premier : BB4 1 à 482 (1790-1826) 
 
 
 
 
 
 
 

Frigates of the Royal Navy
Age of Sail frigates of France
1797 ships
Frigates of the French Navy
Captured ships
Maritime incidents in 1804
Shipwrecks in the Atlantic Ocean
Privateer ships of France